Miraz is a fictional character from C. S. Lewis's fantasy series The Chronicles of Narnia. He is the main antagonist in the book Prince Caspian, and is the uncle of the book's protagonist.

Miraz killed his brother, Caspian IX, allowing his nephew to live as heir until, as the book opens, his wife bears him a legitimate heir. He is a descendant of the Telmarines who had invaded Narnia hundreds of years before, and a cruel and unpopular ruler. Most notorious for banning the teaching of Narnia's pre-Telmarine history, he also levies high taxes and enacts harsh laws. He is ultimately defeated in a duel by Peter Pevensie and then slain by his own advisors.

Significance 
The relationship between Miraz and his brother's son, Prince Caspian, resembles that of Claudius and Hamlet in Shakespeare's play Hamlet, as well as Pelias and Jason from Greek mythology.
In a Christianity Today opinion piece published in 2008, Devin Brown noted that Miraz was "aloof and emotionally distant" like Lewis' own father.  This theme is explored in more detail in Chandler Hanton's dissertation, The Tragedy of Caspian: C. S. Lewis and His Trauma.

Adaptations 
In the 1989 BBC adaptation, Miraz is played by Robert Lang.
In the 2008 cinematic adaptation, Miraz is portrayed by Sergio Castellitto, an accomplished Italian actor hypothesized by IGN as chosen "to give the Telmarines a Latin-Mediterranean ethnic flavor." The New York Times' review noted that the film's "major source of dramatic energy is the villain, Caspian’s uncle Miraz, who is played with malignant grandeur" by Castellitto. While panning the movie as a whole, movie critic Mick LaSalle found Miraz "square-shouldered and decisive and, by medieval king standards, probably not all that bad. His beard may be too pointy for virtue, but he's hardly evil enough to make it worth yanking the Pevensie siblings out of 1940s England." In an extended critique of the movie, Steven D. Boyer complains that the rivalry between Caspian and Peter is nowhere in the books, but is rather itself a reflection of Miraz' original character.

References

The Chronicles of Narnia characters
Literary characters introduced in 1951
Fictional fratricides
Fictional kings
Fictional regicides
Fantasy film characters
Kings and Queens of Narnia
Male characters in film
Male characters in literature
Male literary villains